South Street station is a light rail surface stop on the MBTA Green Line B branch, located in the median of Commonwealth Avenue east of South Street in the Brighton neighborhood of Boston, Massachusetts. South Street is the lowest-ridership stop on the B branch, with just 214 daily boardings by a 2011 survey.

Track work in 2018–19, which included replacement of platform edges at several stops, triggered requirements for accessibility modifications at those stops. By December 2022, design for South Street and four other B Branch stops was 30% complete, with construction expected to last from fall 2023 to mid-2024.

References

External links

MBTA - South Street
 Station from Google Maps Street View

Brighton, Boston
Green Line (MBTA) stations
Railway stations in Boston